John Parkinson Whiteside (11 June 1861 – 8 March 1946) was an English cricketer active from 1888 to 1906 who played for Lancashire and Leicestershire. He was born in Fleetwood, Lancashire and died in Leicester. He appeared in 231 first-class matches as a righthanded batsman who kept wicket. He scored 1,362 runs with a highest score of 50 and completed 337 catches with 101 stumpings.

Notes

1861 births
1946 deaths
English cricketers
Lancashire cricketers
Leicestershire cricketers
Marylebone Cricket Club cricketers
North v South cricketers
People from Fleetwood
Earl De La Warr's XI cricketers